David Torres Ortiz (born 5 March 2003) is a Spanish footballer who plays as a central defender for Real Valladolid Promesas.

Club career
Born in Valladolid, Castile and León, Torres was a Real Valladolid youth graduate.  He made his senior debut with the reserves on 25 September 2021, coming on as a late substitute in a 4–2 Primera División RFEF away loss against Cultural y Deportiva Leonesa.

Torres made his first team debut on 12 November 2022, starting in a 2–0 away win over UD Barbadás, for the season's Copa del Rey. His professional debut occurred the following 4 January, as he replaced Juanjo Narváez late into a 1–0 loss at Deportivo Alavés, also for the national cup.

Career statistics

Club

Personal life
Torres' father Javier was also a footballer and a defender. He too played for Valladolid.

References

External links

2003 births
Living people
Spanish footballers
Footballers from Valladolid
Association football defenders
Primera Federación players
Segunda Federación players
Real Valladolid Promesas players
Real Valladolid players